An election for the Alnwick District Council was held on 6 May 1999.  The whole council was up for election with boundary changes since the last election in 1995, increasing the number of seats by 1.  The council stayed under no overall control.

Election result

External links
BBC report of 1999 Alnwick election result

1999 English local elections
1999
20th century in Northumberland